Maria Herichová (born 12 June 1990) is a Slovak retired ice hockey forward and member of the Slovak national team.

International career
Herichová was selected for the Slovakia national women's ice hockey team in the 2010 Winter Olympics. She played in all five games, recording one assist. She played all three games of the qualifying campaigns for the 2010 and 2014 Olympics.

Herichová has also appeared for Slovakia at six IIHF Women's World Championships, across three levels. Her first appearance came in 2007. She appeared at the top level championships in 2011 and 2012.

Career statistics

International career

References

External links
Eurohockey.com Profile
Sports-Reference Profile

1990 births
Living people
Ice hockey players at the 2010 Winter Olympics
Olympic ice hockey players of Slovakia
Sportspeople from Poprad
Slovak women's ice hockey forwards
Universiade medalists in ice hockey
Universiade bronze medalists for Slovakia
Competitors at the 2011 Winter Universiade
Slovak expatriate ice hockey people
Slovak expatriate sportspeople in Austria
Expatriate ice hockey players in Austria